Callerebia nirmala, the common argus is a species of Satyrinae butterfly found in the Himalayas.

See also
Satyrinae
Nymphalidae
List of butterflies of India (Satyrinae)

References

Satyrini
Butterflies of Asia
Fauna of India
Fauna of Pakistan